Untouchable Lawman (Korean: 치외법권) is a 2015 South Korean action comedy film directed by Shin Jai-ho. It was released on August 27, 2015.

Cast
Im Chang-jung
Choi Daniel
Lim Eun-kyung
Kim Ji-eun as Eun-ju
Lee Jin-kwon as Ma-neul's right-hand man

Reception
The film has grossed ₩1.98 billion.

References

2015 action comedy films
South Korean action comedy films
Films directed by Shin Jai-ho
2010s South Korean films
2010s Korean-language films